Shikari ( Hunter) is a 2016 Bangladesh-India joint venture Action thriller  film directed by Joydip Mukherjee and Zakir Hossain Simanto. Produced by Abdul Aziz and Himanshu Dhanuka under the Jaaz Multimedia and Eskay Movies banners and it stars Bangladeshi superstar Shakib Khan, Srabanti Chatterjee, Rahul Dev and Sabyasachi Chakrabarty in pivotal roles and centers around Khan, a disguised professional assassin with mysterious past, tasked with assassinating a top government official. The film also features Amit Hasan, Kharaj Mukherjee, and Shupriyo Dutta in supporting roles.  The soundtrack album and background score of the film was composed by Indraadip Dasgupta.

A collaborative Jaaz-Eskay project involving Khan was first reported during mid 2014. However, the project was later shelved due to unavailability of actor. Due to numerous media reports, the film was originally planned to be a multi-starrer film. Eskay Movies & Jaaz Multimedia intended to begin production of the film again after revisions in the script of the film. The production was officially announced by Eskay Movies & Jaaz Multimedia in January 2016, and Zakir Hossain Simanto and Joydip Mukherjee was hired as directors. The film is produced by Abdul Aziz and Ashok Dhanuka, under the production of Jaaz Multimedia and Eskay Movies. A few percent of the film and songs were shot in London, UK. The film was released in Bangladesh on 7 July 2016. It became 2nd highest-grossing Bangladeshi film of 2016. For the film Khan won his eighth Meril-Prothom Alo Awards for Best Actor and nominated in critics choice Best Actor category.

It is an official remake of the 2009 Tamil film Aadhavan which was itself inspired from the 1990 Malayalam film His Highness Abdullah.

Plot
Sultan is a professional assassin who had run away from home in his childhood after being convicted of attempting to murder his father. Dev Roy, an influential child trafficker hires Sultan to kill prominent Judge Rudro Chowdhury, since he is handling the inquiry and verdict on Dev Roy's child trafficking case in Kolkata. Sultan arrives in Kolkata and attempts to murder Judge Chowdhury by sniping, but misfires due to large crowd and media around the Judge. The West Bengal police force chases after him, but ultimately fails to catch him. After Dev Roy insults him for his inability, Sultan is angry with himself, and vows to kill Judge Chowdhury within ten days.

Sultan enters Judge Chowdhury's household disguising as a servant, and slowly begins to win over the members of the family.

Cast
 Shakib Khan as Raghob Chowdhury / Sultan / Hridoyharan
 Srabanti Chatterjee as Chhutki/Riya
 Sabyasachi Chakrabarty as Rudro Chowdhury
 Rahul Dev as Dev Roy
 Amit Hasan as IPS Rudro
 Supriyo Dutta as Abdulla/Abbu
 Kharaj Mukherjee as Teenkori
 Lily Chakrabarty as Raghab alias Sultan's grandmother
 Subrata
 Parthasarathi Chakraborty as Bappy Man
 Shiba Shanu as security guard Khan
 Rebeka Rouf as Chowdhury's wife
 Dr.Sohel Babu

Production

Casting and development
The project was first announced in January 2016 with an official statement by Jaaz Multimedia. Srabanti Chatterjee was signed to play the female lead opposite Khan in the film. The film was made official in a press conference held in Dhaka on 7 March 2016, where the cast members of the film were introduced.

Filming
The shooting schedule of Shikari commenced on 14 March 2016. The first phase of the film was shot in 12-day schedule and entirely filmed in Kolkata. The second phase of the filming took place in London. The last phase of the film was filmed in Dhaka, and lasted 26-days. The entire film was shot on a 48-day schedule. During filming, the shooting was halted for 2-days in Kolkata due to strike from the production crew.

The music of the film was shot at various locations in London and Kolkata. A romantic track sequence was shot at Beachy Head in East Sussex, England while other sequences were shot at Piccadilly Circus.

Release
The film also released in North America and Europe on 12 August 2016.

Promotions
Promotion of Shikari began on 16 June 2016 with the release of "Harabo Toke Niye" on YouTube. The track featured Shakib Khan, Srabanti Chatterjee and the track was shot in London. The video received an overwhelming response of YouTube, and creating record of becoming the fastest Bengali language video track to reach 1 million views. The track received praises from audiences and critics. The official teaser of the film was revealed on 18 June 2016 and instantly became the top trend online for 24 hours. Khan's new look and highly packed action sequences were highly praised. The film officially began promotion with a press conference on 22 June 2016, where the films' cast and crews were present.

Soundtrack
The soundtrack of Shikari was released worldwide on 12 August 2016.

Accolades

References

Further reading

External links
 
 
 Shikari at the Bangla Movie Database
 Shikari Official Facebook

Bengali-language Bangladeshi films
Bengali-language Indian films
2016 films
Bangladeshi action comedy-drama films
2010s action comedy-drama films
Films shot in Dhaka
Films set in London
2010s Bengali-language films
2016 romantic comedy-drama films
Bangladeshi remakes of Indian films
Bangladeshi romantic comedy-drama films
Films scored by Indradeep Dasgupta
Films about contract killing
2016 comedy films
2016 drama films
Films directed by Joydip Mukherjee
Jaaz Multimedia films